Chezhiyan is an Indian filmmaker and director of photography who works primarily in the Tamil film industry. He received critical acclaim for his work in Kalloori (2007), Paradesi (2013) and To Let (2017).

Early life and education
Chezhiyan was born in Sivaganga, Tamil Nadu, where he did his early schooling. His parents were primary school teachers. His father was an artist who used to draw and would make toys with clays, his mother was a storyteller and also a singer. He completed his diploma in civil engineering from Alagappa Chettiar College in Karaikudi. Chezhiyan was also interested in photography right from his early days and was into drawing and painting.

Career
After completing his civil engineering degree, he started his career as an apprentice to P. C. Sreeram before establishing himself as a cinematographer. He worked as an assistant director in the film Thambi (2006). The film's cinematographer left the shoots after 60 days and hence the film director Seeman asked him to double up as cinematographer. He then shot the climax and all the songs and worked for the remaining 30 days. His name had featured as "additional cinematographer" in Thambi.

Chezhiyan made his debut as a full-fledged cinematographer with Kalloori (2007). Kalloori opened to critical acclaim in December 2007, with a critic stating that "Chezhian's cinematography is perfection itself, capturing the dustiness of the surrounds and the college accurately". He then worked in S. Shankar's production Rettaisuzhi, in V. Gowthaman's Magizhchi and in Seenu Ramasamy's Thenmerku Paruvakaatru, the latter won the National Film Award for Best Feature Film in Tamil.

He received critical acclaim for his work in Bala's Paradesi (2013) and went on to win many awards, including the Best Cinematography Award at the 2013 BFI London Film Festival Awards.

He then worked in the thriller film Sawaari (2016), in Tharai Thappattai (2016), teaming up with director Bala for the second time, and the critically acclaimed film Joker (2016).

 To Let.

Chezhiyan made his directorial debut with To Let (2017) and it was produced by his wife Prema under the couple's own production company "La Cinema". The film, inspired by real-life incidents, portrayed the ordeal of a lower-middle-class family hunting for a rented house. At the 65th National Film Awards, it won in the category Best Feature Film in Tamil.

Other works
Chezhiyan received the Katha award for his short story Harmoniam in 2004. He has also authored a series of books on cinema titled Ulaga Cinema (World Cinema) in Tamil, and the series was published by the Tamil weekly Ananda Vikatan between 2005 and 2007. The recognition got him a Fellowship from the Department of Culture for two years, to explore the theme of Imagery in Short Stories. He has worked as a cinematographer in many documentaries, including A Little Dream (2008), a biographical docu-fiction about the former India President A. P. J. Abdul Kalam, and a documentary about the Tamil writer Jayakanthan.

Filmography

Feature films

Short films and documentaries
 Thiruvizha (2002)
 A Little Dream (2008)
 Ellaigalai Vistharitha Ezhuthu Kalaignan (2011)

References

External links

 To Let

Living people
Place of birth missing (living people)
Film directors from Tamil Nadu
Tamil film directors
Cinematographers from Tamil Nadu
Tamil film cinematographers
Tamil screenwriters
Tamil writers
People from Sivaganga district
21st-century Indian photographers
21st-century Indian film directors
Year of birth missing (living people)
National Film Award (India) winners